The Bierpinsel (beer brush, in English) is the nickname of a 47-meter-high building built in 1976 and located on Schloßstraße in Steglitz, Berlin. The building is noted for its futuristic architecture. The building has been listed as a protected structure since January 2017.

History 
The Steglitz Tower Restaurant, opened on October 13, 1976, and was in construction between 1972 and 1976, by architects Ralf Schüler and his wife Ursulina Schüler-Witte. The architecture is part of the pop art movement. There had been issues with the funding of the initial construction of the building, and it ran over budget more than once. 

The building was an extension of the Joachim Tiburtius Bridge. The tower was created out of concrete, plastic cladding and paint. The exterior of the building was originally red around the top section.

The building's name "," came from Berlin slang and was built in a form that resembles a tree. A later owner took over the name officially in the company name  (literally Beer Brush Ltd). The building was sold in 2007 to a new owner who founded a company called  (literally Castle Tower Ltd). That company was sold to the Immoma group in 2021.

The Immoma group wants to refurbish the building beginning in 2023.

Turmkunst 2010
Starting in April 2010, several prominent graffiti artists painted the exterior of the structure over several weeks, as part of the Turmkunst 2010 (English: Tower Art 2010) project - an exhibition of street-art taking place both in and around the tower.

References

External links

 

Buildings and structures in Steglitz-Zehlendorf
Towers in Berlin